The Exchange Hotel in Gordonsville, Virginia, was built in 1860 for Richard F. Omohundro next to an important railroad junction, when the Exchange Hotel offered a welcome stopping place for weary passengers on the Virginia Central Railroad.

Civil War
In March 1862, because of its strategic location, the Exchange Hotel became part of the Gordonsville Receiving Hospital, admitting more than 23,000 sick and wounded in less than a year. The wounded and dying from nearby battlefields such as Cedar Mountain, Chancellorsville, Trevilian Station, Mine Run, Brandy Station, and the Wilderness were brought by the trainloads. Although this was primarily a Confederate facility, the hospital treated the wounded from both sides. Twenty-six Union soldiers died here. By war's end more than 70,000 men had been treated at the Gordonsville Receiving Hospital and just over 700 would be buried on its surrounding grounds. The scene of untold agony and death, the building survived the conflict.

After the war
In the reconstruction period, this hospital served the newly freed slaves as a Freedman's Bureau Hospital. As the United States healed and the railroads boomed, this graceful building again became a hotel and enjoyed a fine reputation until the 1940s when it went into decline.

Museum
Historic Gordonsville, Inc. acquired and restored the property in 1971.  The museum contains many artifacts from the Civil War era, like medical artifacts, uniforms and firearms.  The museum also houses a bookstore.  It is located in the Gordonsville Historic District.

References

External links
Official Website

Hotels in Virginia
Museums in Orange County, Virginia
Hotel buildings on the National Register of Historic Places in Virginia
Hotel buildings completed in 1860
American Civil War museums in Virginia
African-American museums in Virginia
Greek Revival architecture in Virginia
Hotels established in 1862
Railway hotels in the United States
National Register of Historic Places in Orange County, Virginia
Individually listed contributing properties to historic districts on the National Register in Virginia
1860 establishments in Virginia